Cheshmeh-ye Abdal Karim (also Romanized as Cheshmeh-ye ʿAbdāl Karīm) is a village in Bagh-e Keshmir Rural District, Salehabad County, Razavi Khorasan Province, Iran. At the 2006 census, its population was 156, in 35 families.

References 

Populated places in Torbat-e Jam County